KK Palace is a football (soccer) team in Ondangwa, Namibia.

They are internationally known for taking part in the longest Penalty-Shootout ever, where they beat F.C. Civics Windhoek on January 23, 2004 after 48 kicks and a 17–16 victory in the first round of the NFA Cup after a 2-2 draw after 90 minutes (there was no extra-time played in that tournament). At that time, Civics were the leader of the Namibian first division, while KK Palace played in second division. A common rumour is that this was the final match of the tournament, but this is verifiably untrue: In fact, KK Palace was knocked out in the second round after losing 0-3 to Black Africa S.C. The tournament was eventually won by Ramblers F.C., who defeated KK Palace-defeaters Black Africa in the final.

References

Football clubs in Namibia